Short Circuit is a novel by Colin Wedgelock published in 1986.

Plot summary
Short Circuit is a novel in which a robot comes alive after being stuck by lighting, as a novelization of the film Short Circuit.

Reception
Dave Langford reviewed Short Circuit for White Dwarf #87, and stated that "I haven't seen the film, but the novelization is taut and funny: ultimate weapons which fancy themselves at disco dancing are OK by me."

Reviews
Review by Helen McNabb (1987) in Paperback Inferno, #65

References

1986 novels